Alexander Ronald George Strutt, 4th Baron Belper (28 April 1912 – 23 December 1999), was a British hereditary peer, British Army officer, and equestrian.

Early life and education
On 28 April 1912, Strutt was born to Algernon Strutt, 3rd Baron Belper, and his wife Eva Isabel Mary Bruce. He was educated at Harrow School, an all-boys public school in London. He underwent officer training at the Royal Military College, Sandhurst.

Career

Military service
Having completed his officer training, Strutt was commissioned into the Coldstream Guards on 1 September 1932 as a second lieutenant. He was promoted to lieutenant on 1 September 1935, to captain on 1 September 1940, and to major on 1 July 1946.

Strutt saw active service during the Second World War, and was wounded on active duty in 1944.

Equestrian career
He rode Crown Prince (owned by his stepfather, Lord Rosebery) to victory in the National Hunt Chase Challenge Cup at Cheltenham in 1934. He was, for some time, racing manager for Stavros Niarchos. As an owner his best horse was Cesarewitch Handicap victor Persian Lancer. It won in 1966, ridden by Doug Smith. He was Master of the Quorn Hunt from 1948 to 1954.

Family
On 15 November 1940, Strutt married Zara Sophie Kathleen Mary Mainwaring. She was the daughter of Sir Henry Mainwaring, 5th Baronet, and Generis Williams-Bulkeley. There was one child from this marriage:

Richard Henry Strutt, 5th Baron Belper (b. 24 October 1941).

He and Zara Sophie Kathleen Mary Mainwaring were divorced in 1949. She later married Peter Cazalet, trainer of horses for Queen Elizabeth The Queen Mother.

References

External links

1912 births
1999 deaths
Coldstream Guards officers
English jockeys
Masters of foxhounds in England
People educated at Harrow School
Graduates of the Royal Military College, Sandhurst
Eldest sons of British hereditary barons
British Army personnel of World War II
Ronald
Belper